Ekaterina Evdokimova (born 10 September 1994) is a Russian volleyball player for VC Uralochka-NTMK and the Russian national team.

She participated at the 2017 Women's European Volleyball Championship.

References

External links
 
 
 Ekaterina Evdokimova at Volleybox.net

1994 births
Living people
Russian women's volleyball players
Universiade medalists in volleyball
Universiade gold medalists for Russia
Medalists at the 2019 Summer Universiade
20th-century Russian women
21st-century Russian women